Windmill Theatre Co (previously known as Windmill Performing Arts), established in 2002 as a South Australian Government initiative, is Australia's flagship professional theatre company for child and young adult audiences.  artistic director is Rosemary Myers.

History
Windmill Performing Arts was established in 2001 by the South Australian Government under the Public Corporations (Australian Children's Performing Arts Company) Regulations 2001, which was superseded by the 2016 Regulations.

The founding director and creative producer was Cate Fowler (through 2007).  The founding patron was children's author Mem Fox (through 2007).

In 2007, executive producer Kaye Weeks and artistic director Rosemary Myers first came on board and are still with Windmill . The company has experienced enormous growth and success since then.

Productions and growth
Windmill performs a season in Adelaide each year, with shows also touring through regional South Australia and elsewhere in Australia. Windmill have also toured internationally, performing in many countries, including in the US (including Off-Broadway), New Zealand, United Kingdom, Singapore and South Korea. It has grown substantially in recent years: in 2014, the company toured to four cities, presenting a total of 144 live performances; in 2018, the number of live performances had increased to 234, and the number of cities and towns visited increased eightfold, to 34.

The company was behind the multi-award-winning film Girl Asleep, including the 2016 CinefestOz best film, adapted from its stage production.

Governance and funding
Arts SA was responsible for the state funding arrangements until Windmill was transferred to the Department of Education in 2018 by the Marshall government.

In July 2019, the state budget slashed funding to the History Trust of South Australia, Carclew, Patch Theatre Company and Windmill, as part of "operational efficiency" cuts.

References

External links 
 Windmill Theatre

Theatre companies in Australia
Performing arts in Adelaide
2002 establishments in Australia
Culture of South Australia